Victoria Neave Criado (born December 29, 1980) is an American attorney and a Democratic member of the Texas House of Representatives for District 107 in Dallas County, Texas. In the general election held on November 8, 2016, she unseated Republican Representative Kenneth Sheets in the most expensive Texas House race of the 2016 cycle. Neave was sworn into office on January 10, 2017.

Neave was arrested in June 2017 on a Driving While Intoxicated charge after she allegedly crashed her BMW into a tree within district 107 at 11:30 p.m. She allegedly repeatedly told arresting officers that "I love you and I want to fight for you, and I invoke the Fifth Amendment." Neave said after her arrest that she was "deeply sorry, and will accept the consequences of my actions, and will work to make this right." As a local attorney and legislator, concerns were expressed at favoritism by police, prosecutors and local media towards Neave. 

Neave was reelected to her second term in the general election held on November 6, 2018, when she defeated the Republican candidate, Deanna Maria Metzger, 28,923 (57.1 percent) to 21,770 (42.9 percent).

Neave was selected as one of seventeen speakers to jointly deliver the keynote address at the 2020 Democratic National Convention.

References

|-

1980 births
21st-century American politicians
Living people
Democratic Party members of the Texas House of Representatives
Politicians from Dallas
Texas lawyers
Thurgood Marshall School of Law alumni
Women state legislators in Texas
21st-century American women politicians